Zayastrebye is a rural locality (a selo) in Muromtsevskoye Rural Settlement, Sudogodsky District, Vladimir Oblast, Russia. The population was 28 as of 2010.

Geography 
Zayastrebye is located 16 km southeast of Sudogda (the district's administrative centre) by road. Alferovo is the nearest rural locality.

References 

Rural localities in Sudogodsky District